The 1874 Dublin County by-election was fought on 18 March 1874.  The byelection was fought due to the incumbent Conservative MP, Thomas Edward Taylor, becoming Chancellor of the Duchy of Lancaster.  It was retained by the incumbent.

References

1874 elections in the United Kingdom
March 1874 events
By-elections to the Parliament of the United Kingdom in County Dublin constituencies
Ministerial by-elections to the Parliament of the United Kingdom
1874 elections in Ireland